South East Asia–Middle East–Western Europe 6 (SEA-ME-WE 6) is an in progress optical fibre submarine communications cable system that would carry telecommunications between Southeast Asia, the Middle East, and Western Europe. It is estimated to cost between $65 million and US$72 million.  Bangladesh, Singapore, Malaysia, Indonesia, Thailand, Sri Lanka, India, Pakistan, Saudi Arabia, Qatar, Oman, the UAE, Djibouti, Egypt, Turkey, Italy, France, Myanmar and Yemen are members of the SEA-ME-WE-6 Consortium. It will run from Singapore to France and will have a bandwidth of 120 Tbps.  Once completed, It will be 19,200 km long.  Work on SEA-ME-WE 6 began in early 2022.  It is expected to be operation in the first quarter of 2025. In Saudi Arabia, its landing point will be the Mobily landing station in the city of Yanbu.

References

Submarine communications cables in the Indian Ocean
Submarine communications cables in the Arabian Sea
Submarine communications cables in the Mediterranean Sea
Submarine communications cables in the Red Sea
Telecommunications in India